The Clyde Walkway is a foot and mountain bike path which runs from Glasgow, Scotland, to just above the UNESCO World Heritage Site of New Lanark. The path runs close to the River Clyde for most of its length. It was completed in 2005, and is now designated as one of Scotland's Great Trails by NatureScot. About 155,000 people use the path every year, of whom about 7,750 undertake multi-day journeys including those covering the entire route.

Route of the path

Glasgow to Cambuslang Bridge
The bridge is a short distance from Cambuslang railway station. The path passes by a number of other long distance paths, including the Glasgow to Inverness National Cycle Route, the Kelvin Walkway and paths to Edinburgh, Irvine and Greenock. The path passes a number of sites of interest.

Cambuslang Bridge to Strathclyde Country Park
For most of this section the path stays close to the River Clyde. It passes Bothwell Castle, David Livingstone Centre, the remains of Craighead Viaduct, Raith Haugh Nature Reserve and Bothwell Bridge Lido. After crossing Bothwell Road at the Lido the path used to return to the side of the river, but since the Raith Interchange upgrade now shares the cycle paths over the interchange and under the M74 in to Strathclyde Park. This section of the path ends at the Watersports Centre in Strathclyde Country Park.

Strathclyde Country Park to Cardies Bridge
It passes the Avon Walkway which can be followed to Chatelherault Country Park.

Cardies Bridge to Crossford
This  section runs through attractive open countryside. This part of the Clyde Valley was famous for its orchards and greenhouses. Many remain, though few of the orchards are still in commercial production. The path passes the well preserved 16th century Craignethan Castle. This section ends at the village of Crossford. There are bus services to Lanark, and to Hamilton.

Crossford to New Lanark
The path proceeds through open country along the banks of the River Clyde. It first passes Stonybyres Hydroelectric Station. This was built in 1927. After passing Lanark (founded 1180) the path enters the UNESCO World Heritage village of New Lanark. The village and mills were built in the 18th century to harness the power of the River Clyde to process cotton. It is now a restored industrial village in a rural setting. Beyond the village the path enters the Falls of Clyde Nature Reserve and passes the Bonnington Hydroelectric Station, and the remaining three Falls of Clyde.

The path ends in open countryside at the top fall, Bonnington Linn, where there is a dam to divert water to the power station. The station is one of the termini of the Argyle Line.

References

External links 

Clyde Walkway Official Website
Clyde Walkway guide and maps on Walkhighlands
Annotated map of the Clyde Walkway 

Tourist attractions in Glasgow
Tourist attractions in South Lanarkshire
Cambuslang
Scotland's Great Trails
Mountain biking venues in the United Kingdom
Cycleways in Scotland
Partick
Glasgow Green
Bridgeton–Calton–Dalmarnock
Bothwell and Uddingston
Blantyre, South Lanarkshire
Motherwell
River Clyde
Clydesdale
Lanark
2005 establishments in Scotland